Bidofydd was a 6th-century saint of Wales, often associated with saint Fidalis.

His feast day is 26 April.

References

Welsh Roman Catholic saints
6th-century Christian saints